The Gundungurra people, also spelt Gundungara, Gandangarra, Gandangara and other variations, are an Aboriginal Australian people in south-eastern New South Wales, Australia. Their traditional lands include present day Goulburn, Wollondilly Shire, The Blue Mountains and the Southern Highlands.

Name
The ethnonym Gundangara combines lexical elements signifying both "east" and west'.

Language

The first attempt at a brief description of the Gundangara language was undertaken by R. H. Mathews in 1901. The language is classified as a subset of the Yuin-Kuric branch of the Pama-Nyungan language family, and is very close to Ngunnawal.

Country
The Gandangara lived throughout an area covering an estimated  in the south-east region of New South Wales. According to Norman Tindale, their lands encompassed Goulburn and Berrima, running down the Nepean River (Wollondilly) until the vicinity of Camden. This includes the catchments of the Wollondilly and Coxs rivers, and some territory west of the Great Dividing Range.

Their neighbours are the Dharug and the Eora to their north, Darkinung, Wiradjuri Ngunawal and Thurrawal, (eastwards) peoples.

Social organisation
The Gandangara were formed into a variety of hordes, among which were the
 Therabulat (middle Coxs River area)
 Burragorang

History
In 1802, the explorer Francis Barrallier met the Gundungara people as his party moved through "The Cowpastures" southwest of Sydney, crossing the Nattai to the Wollondilly River and up to the heights above where Yerranderie now stands. Barrallier noted in his journal that the Gundungara "themselves build huts for the strangers they wish to receive as friends." Most of their land was initially not appetizing for early settlers, given the poor quality of the Nepean sandstone soils, and in a bid to stop encroachments they are said to have petitioned Governor King successfully in order to secure protected access to their riverine yam beds. This promise was maintained until King's departure in 1807.

In 1811 Governor Macquarie started handing out numerous "land grants" to settlers in the Darawal area around Appin, one as large as  given to William Broughton.

In March 1814, some Aborigines were violently driven away after they complained of not being paid their wages for working for white settlers. In May an Aboriginal woman and three children were killed during skirmishes near the Milehouse and Butcher farms, and in retaliation, 3 Europeans were killed. Though this was on traditional Darawal lands, these fatal incidents, like a further one at Bringelly in June, were attributed to the Gandangara coming over from the west. The Gandangara joined forces with the Thurrawal/Darawal, who had linked up with remnants of the Dharug, in order to participate in the frontier war, also raiding cornfields. The decline in Dharug population had opened up parts of their territory to use by neighbouring tribal groups, which also fought among themselves. Aside from considerations of defending their territories against the European colonial expansion, a period of severe drought may have influenced this turn in strategy. Gandangara raiding bands, harvesting crops on settlers' properties, also attacked the Thurrawal and Dharug, so that the latter two began to collaborate against them, by helping the British authorities, and seeking refuge in squatters' settlements. Like other tribes, the Gandangara had developed strategies to cope with the superior firepower of musketry, teasing troops to fire at them, in the knowledge that, once fired, some time was required to reload them, during which the aborigines could launch spearing attacks.

In 1816, 7 settlers, 4 on the Nepean and 3 at Macquarie's wife's property at Camden, were killed as the Gandangara came out of the hill lands in search of food. Macquarie ordered the 46th Regiment under Captain James Wallis to round up all Aborigines from the Hawkesbury down to these southern areas. These punitive expeditions aimed to strike terror into anyone surviving them. Wallis often found settlers unwilling to hand over the Darawal people who lived on their stations, but eventually, executing what he later recalled was a "melancholy but necessary duty", tracked down a group camping under the Cataract River near Appin. According to the local historian Anne-Maree Whitaker, what followed on 17 April 1816 was a massacre.
Hearing a child's cry and a barking dog in the bush, Wallis lined up his soldiers to search for the fugitives. In the moonlight they could see figures jumping across the rocky landscape. Some of the Aborigines were shot and others were driven off the cliffs into a steep gorge. At least fourteen were killed and the only survivors were two women and three children. Among those killed was a mountain chief Conibigal, an old man called Balyin, a Dharawal man called  Dunell, along with several women and children.

Aboriginal descendants claim the figure of 14 is an underestimate, and that many more were slaughtered. The bodies of Conibigal and Dunell, after being decapitated, were hung from trees near Broughton's property, as a warning to foraging natives. Their skulls, together with that of another beheaded woman, were exchanged for 30 shillings and a gallon of rum each in Sydney, according to the recollections of William Byrne in 1903, and were sent to England where they were lodged for study at Edinburgh University, and were only returned recently, in 1991 and 2000, and negotiations have been underway for over a decade to have the remains, in Canberra, buried. The area believed to be the site where the Appin Massacre took place was returned to the local Aboriginal community by an act of Parliament.

In 1828, there was some interaction between the Surveyor-General, Thomas Mitchell, and the Gandangara, near Mittagong. Mitchell was supervising road construction. The Gandarangara are said to have composed a cheeky song about the building of the road (perhaps with appropriate mimicry): Road goes creaking long shoes, Road goes uncle and brother white man see. It must have seemed that building a road just to visit kin was unnecessary effort. Men from the Gandarangara also acted as guides for Mitchell at the time.

Notwithstanding the attempts to disperse, round them up, or kill them under Macquarie's direction, the Gandangara population, able to take refuge in the tough hinterlands like the Burragorong, have sustained itself as an organized social group somewhat better than other neighbouring peoples like the Dharug, for in the 1860s they returned to demand restitution of their lands.

Remnants of the Gandangara lived at Burragorang on the Wollondilly River, where they were interviewed in the early 1900s by the ethnographer R. H. Mathews, who took down some of their legendary lore.

Beliefs 
According to Gandangara belief, in the primordial dreamtime (gun-yung-ga-lung, "times far past"), two creator figures, Gurangatch, a rainbow serpent, and Mirragañ, a quoll, went on a journey from a point on the upper reaches of the Wollondilly River, with Mirragan pursuing the former, until the trek ended at a waterhole named Joolundoo on the Upper Fish River. Much of this landscape with its minute Gandangara toponymic descriptions considered to be "one of the best documented Aboriginal cultural landscapes", was submerged with the construction of the Warragamba Dam after WW2. At that time animals were human, and collectively the animal people of that pristine world were known as Burringilling.

Gurangatch, not wholly a serpent, but part fish, and part reptile, camped in the shallows of an area known as Murraural, specifically at the junction of the Wollondilly and Wingeecaribbee rivers. It was here, while he basked in the sun, that the redoubtable fish-hunter, Mirragañ the quoll, glimpsed the light reflected from Gurangatch's eyes and endeavoured, unsuccessfully, to spear him. The quoll tried to force his prey back from the depths of the waterhole, where Gurangatch had sought refuge, by planting ever more bundles of nauseating slabs of millewa hickory bark here and there in the various soaks and pools. Gurangatch, wise to the plan, burrowed his way out, tunneling through the landscape, drawing the lagoon waters in his train, till he emerged on a high rocky ridge called thereafter Birrimbunnungalai, since it is rich in birrimbunnung (sprats)

The features of the landscape were etched as Gurangatch wriggled and slipped across and under the terrain, in flight from his predator, or sometimes while directly fighting with him. When Mirragañ caught up with his prey, he would flail away at him with a club (boodee), while Gurangatch would strike by thrashing his tormentor with a whipping from his tail. The site now called Slippery Rock, native name Wonggaree, marks a point where they engaged in struggle for a long time, wearing the rock down so smoothly that people slip on it ever since. In a 2021 FlyLife article, Karl Brandt proposed the Australian lungfish as the inspiration for Gurangatch.

Alternative spellings
 Gandangarra
 Gandangara
 Gundungura
 Gundungurra

Some words
 boobal. (a boy)
 boombi (spring (of water))
 bul'lan. (a woman)
 goodha (a child of either sex)
 gwan (shit).
 mullunga (a girl)
 murriñ (a man)
 warrambal (young).
 werriberri (tree ferns).

Notes

Citations

Sources

Aboriginal peoples of New South Wales
Australian Aboriginal legendary creatures
Macarthur (New South Wales)
Southern Highlands (New South Wales)